Already Tomorrow in Hong Kong is a 2015 romance film written and directed by Emily Ting and starring real-life couple Jamie Chung and Bryan Greenberg. The film premiered at the 2015 Los Angeles Film Festival received a limited theatrical and VOD release in February 2016.

Plot
Outside a bar, Ruby Lin (Jamie Chung), an American children's toy designer temporarily in Hong Kong, makes plans over her phone to meet her friends at another bar. Overhearing that her phone doesn't have GPS and she is lost, American expat Josh Rosenberg (Bryan Greenberg) offers to walk her to her destination. As they walk and talk they find a connection sparking between them. Josh tells Ruby that he works in finance but longs to be a writer and she encourages him to quit his job to write a novel. Once they reach the location where Ruby is supposed to meet her friends, Ruby offers to blow them off to get a drink with Josh. At the bar he confesses to Ruby that he has a girlfriend and the reason he was outside the bar and overheard Ruby's conversation was because he had left his girlfriend inside doing birthday shots and flirting with other men. Ruby is infuriated and leaves.

A year later, aboard the Star Ferry, Josh spots Ruby and re-introduces himself hoping to apologize to her. He tells her that their conversation affected him profoundly and he has quit his job in finance to work as a writer over the past year. Ruby tells him that she has been living in Hong Kong for the past year due to a promotion that temporarily relocated her there. In the spirit of honesty, Josh tells Ruby he and his girlfriend are still together while Ruby tells Josh she also has a long-distance boyfriend. The two spend the night reconnecting and gradually feel themselves drifting together romantically once more. While slow dancing at a lounge, Josh is spotted by a friend of his girlfriend's and Ruby is upset, feeling that they have been emotionally cheating with one another. Josh and Ruby split a cab to go home, and Ruby admits to Josh that her boyfriend is actually her fiancé and she is leaving Hong Kong within the week. They both admit that they do not want to cheat with each other but have feelings for each other.

The two sit in the cab outside Ruby's apartment trying to decide what to do.

Cast
 Jamie Chung as Ruby Lin
 Bryan Greenberg as Josh Rosenberg
 Richard Ng as Fortune Teller
 Sarah Lian as Monica
 Zach Hines as Josh's Friend
 Linda Trinh as Joyce

Production
Writer-director Emily Ting, an American of Asian descent, based the script on her own experiences as an expat in Hong Kong. Ting was also inspired by Richard Linklater's Before Sunrise.

Ting cast real-life couple Jamie Chung and Bryan Greenberg to play the couple in her movie after working with Greenberg on The Kitchen.

Reception
The film received generally positive reviews. Andrew Barker for Variety called it "a simple valentine to Hong Kong’s expat nightlife".

References

External links

Films set in Hong Kong
2015 films
American romance films
Films about interracial romance
2015 romance films
2010s English-language films
2010s American films